The World Forum for Harmonization of Vehicle Regulations is a working party (WP.29) of the Inland Transport Committee (ITC) of the United Nations Economic Commission for Europe (UNECE). Its responsibility is to manage the multilateral Agreements signed in 1958, 1997 and 1998 concerning the technical prescriptions for the construction, approval of wheeled vehicles as well as their Periodic Technical Inspection and, to operate within the framework of these three Agreements to develop and amend UN Regulations, UN Global Technical Regulations and UN Rules, kind of vehicle regulation.

WP.29 was established in June 1952 as the "Working Party of experts on technical requirement of vehicles", while its current name was adopted in 2000.

At its inception, WP.29 had a broader European scope. Since 2000, the global scope of this forum was recognized given the active participation of Countries in all continents, excluding the United States and Canada, who developed incompatible standards.

The forum works on regulations covering vehicle safety, environmental protection, energy efficiency and theft-resistance.

This work affects de facto vehicle design and facilitates international trade.

Organization 
There are six permanent Working Parties which are subsidiary bodies that consider specialized tasks, consisting of people with a specific expertise:
 Noise and Tyres (GRBP)
 Lighting and Light-Signalling (GRE)
 Pollution and Energy (GRPE)
 Automated and Connected Vehicles (GRVA)
 General Safety Provisions (GRSG)
 Passive Safety (GRSP)

1958 Agreement
The core of the Forum's work is based around the "1958 Agreement", formally titled "Agreement concerning the adoption of uniform technical prescriptions for wheeled vehicles, equipment and parts which can be fitted and/or be used on wheeled vehicles and the conditions for reciprocal recognition of approvals granted on the basis of these prescriptions" (E/ECE/TRANS/505/Rev.2, amended on 16 October 1995). This forms a legal framework wherein participating countries (contracting parties) agree on a common set of technical prescriptions and protocols for type approval of vehicles and components. These were formerly called "UNECE Regulations" or, less formally, "ECE Regulations" in reference to the Economic Commission for Europe. However, since many non-European countries are now contracting parties to the 1958 Agreement, the regulations are officially entitled "UN Regulations". According to the mutual recognition principle set in the Agreement, each Contracting Party's Type Approvals are recognised by all other Contracting Parties.

Participating countries

The first signatories to the 1958 Agreement include Italy (March 28), Netherlands (March 30), Germany (June 19), France (June 26), Hungary (June 30), Sweden and Belgium. Originally, the agreement allowed participation of ECE member countries only, but in 1995 the agreement was revised to allow non-ECE members to participate. Current participants include European Union and its member countries, as well non-EU UNECE members such as Norway, Russia, Ukraine, Croatia, Serbia, Belarus, Kazakhstan, Turkey, Azerbaijan and Tunisia, and even remote territories such as South Africa, Australia, New Zealand, Japan, South Korea, Thailand and Malaysia.

, the participants to the 1958 Agreement, with their UN country code, were:

Most countries, even if not formally participating in the 1958 agreement, recognise the UN Regulations and either mirror the UN Regulations' content in their own national requirements, or permit the import, registration, and use of UN type-approved vehicles, or both. The United States and Canada (apart from Lighting Regulations) are the two significant exceptions; the UN Regulations are generally not recognised and UN-compliant vehicles and equipment are not authorised for import, sale, or use in the two regions, unless they are tested to be compliant with the region's car safety laws, or for limited non driving use (e.g. car show displays).

Type approval

The 1958 Agreement operates on the principles of type approval and reciprocal recognition. Any country that accedes to the 1958 Agreement has authority to test and approve any manufacturer's design of a regulated product, regardless of the country in which that component was produced. Each individual design from each individual manufacturer is counted as one individual type. Once any acceding country grants a type approval, every other acceding country is obliged to honor that type approval and regard that vehicle or item of motor vehicle equipment as legal for import, sale and use. Items type-approved according to a UN Regulation are marked with an E and a number, within a circle. The number indicates which country approved the item, and other surrounding letters and digits indicate the precise version of the regulation met and the type approval number, respectively.

Although all countries' type approvals are legally equivalent, there are real and perceived differences in the rigour with which the regulations and protocols are applied by different national type approval authorities. Some countries have their own national standards for granting type approvals, which may be more stringent than called for by the UN regulations themselves. Within the auto parts industry, a German (E1) type approval, for example, is regarded as a measure of insurance against suspicion of poor quality or an undeserved type approval.

UN Regulations

, there are 135 UN Regulations appended to the 1958 Agreement; most regulations cover a single vehicle component or technology. A partial list of current regulations applying to passenger cars follows (different regulations may apply to heavy vehicles, motorcycles, etc.)

General lighting
 R3 — Retroreflecting devices
 R4 — Illumination of rear registration plates
 R6 — Direction indicators
 R7 — Front and rear position lamps, stop lamps and end-outline marker lamps
 R19 — Front fog lamps
 R23 — Reversing lights
 R37 — Filament lamps (bulbs) (See: Automotive lamp types)
 R38 — Rear fog lamps
 R48 — Installation of lighting and light-signalling devices
 R77 — Parking lamps
 R87 — Daytime running lamps
 R91 — Side marker lamps
 R112 — Headlamp Asymmetric 
 R119 — Cornering lamps
 R123 — AFS lamps
 R128 — LED light sources

Headlamps 
 R1 — Headlamps emitting an asymmetrical passing beam and/or a driving beam, equipped with R2 or HS1 bulbs (superseded by R112, but still valid for existing approvals)
 R5 — Sealed Beam headlamps emitting an asymmetrical passing beam and/or a driving beam
 R8 — Headlamps equipped with replaceable single-filament tungsten-halogen bulbs (superseded by R112, but still valid for existing approvals)
 R20 — Headlamps emitting an asymmetrical passing beam and/or a driving beam and equipped with halogen double-filament H4 bulbs (superseded by R112, but still valid for existing approvals)
 R31 — Halogen sealed beam headlamps emitting an asymmetrical passing beam and/or a driving beam
 R45 — Headlamp cleaners
 R98 — Headlamps equipped with gas-discharge light sources
 R99 — Gas-discharge light sources for use in approved gas-discharge lamp units of power-driven vehicles (See: Automotive lamp types)
 R112 — Headlamps emitting an asymmetrical passing beam and/or a driving beam and equipped with filament bulbs
 R113 — Headlamps emitting a symmetrical passing beam and/or a driving beam and equipped with filament bulbs

Instrumentation/controls 
 R35 — arrangement of foot controls
 R39 — speedometer equipment
 R46 — rear-view mirrors
 R79 — steering equipment
 R160 — event data recorder

Crashworthiness 
 R11 — door latches and door retention components
 R13-H — braking (passenger cars)
 R13 — braking (trucks and busses)
 R14 — safety belt anchorages
 R16 — safety belts and restraint systems
 R17 — seats, seat anchorages, head restraints
 R27 — advance-warning triangles
 R42 — front and rear protective devices (bumpers, etc.)
 R43 — safety glazing materials and their installation on vehicles
 R94 — protection of the occupants in the event of a frontal collision
 R95 — protection of the occupants in the event of a lateral collision
 R116 — protection of motor vehicles against unauthorized use
 R129 — enhanced child restraint systems (ECRS)

Environmental compatibility 
 R10 — electromagnetic compatibility
 R15 — emissions and fuel consumption (superseded by R83, R84 and R101)
 R24 — engine power measurement, smoke emissions, engine type approval
 R51 — noise emissions
 R68 — measurement of the maximum speed
 R83 — emission of pollutants according to engine fuel requirements
 R84 — measurement of fuel consumption
 R85 — electric drive trains — measurement of the net power and the maximum 30 minutes power of electric drive trains
 R100 — approval of battery electric vehicles with regard to specific requirements for the construction, Functional Safety and hydrogen emission.
 R101 — measurement of the emission of carbon dioxide and fuel consumption
 R117 — rolling sound emissions of tyres

Tyres and wheels 
 R30 — Tyres for passenger cars and their trailers 
 R54 — Tyres for commercial vehicles and their trailers 
 R64 — Temporary use spare unit, run flat tyres, run flat-system and tyre pressure monitoring
 R75 — Tyres for motorcycles/mopeds 
 R88 — Retroreflective tyres for two-wheeled vehicles  
 R106 — Tyres for agricultural vehicles  
 R108 — Retreaded tyres for passenger cars and their trailers
 R109 — Retreaded tyres for commercial vehicles and their trailers 
 R124 — Replacement wheels for passenger cars

Automated/autonomous and connected vehicle regulations 
 R155 — cyber security
 R156 — software updates
 R157 — automated lane keeping system

Brake
 R90 — ECE Regulation 90

North America
The most notable non-signatory to the 1958 Agreement is the United States, which has its own Federal Motor Vehicle Safety Standards and does not recognise UN type approvals. However, both the United States and Canada are parties to the 1998 Agreement. UN-specification vehicles and components which do not also comply with the US regulations therefore cannot be imported to the US without extensive modifications. Canada has its own Canada Motor Vehicle Safety Standards, broadly similar to the US FMVSS, but Canada does also accept UN-compliant headlamps and bumpers. The impending Comprehensive Economic and Trade Agreement between Canada and the European Union could see Canada recognise more UN Regulations as acceptable alternatives to the Canadian regulations.  Canada currently applies 14 of the 17 ECE main standards as allowable alternatives - the exceptions at this point relate to motorcycle controls and displays, motorcycle mirrors, and electronic stability control for passenger cars. These three remaining groups will be allowed in Canada by the time the ratification of the trade deal occurs.

Grey Market (1976-88)

Vehicles built in compliance with global safety and emissions regulations were still available to Americans in the period 1976-88, as individual imports. This was via the grey market. Many of the finest, iconic automobiles of the Malaise era, such as the Lamborghini Countach, Mercedes-Benz 500 SEL, Mercedes-Benz G-Class and Range Rover were officially forbidden to Americans, but this outlet proved viable for many years. The grey market reached 66,900 vehicles imported by individual consumers in 1985, and altered to meet U.S. design regulations.  It is no longer possible to import vehicle into the United States as a personal import, with four exceptions, none of which permits Americans to buy recent vehicles not officially available in the United States. Even prominent billionaire Bill Gates and his Porsche 959 have proven unable.

Self-certification
Rather than a UN-style system of type approvals, the US and Canadian auto safety regulations operate on the principle of self-certification, wherein the manufacturer or importer of a vehicle or item of motor vehicle equipment certifies—i.e., asserts and promises—that the vehicle or equipment complies with all applicable federal or Canada Motor Vehicle Safety, bumper and antitheft standards. No prior verification is required by a governmental agency or authorised testing entity before the vehicle or equipment can be imported, sold, or used. If reason develops to believe the certification was false or improper — i.e., that the vehicle or equipment does not in fact comply — then authorities may conduct tests and, if a noncompliance is found, order a recall and/or other corrective and/or punitive measures. Vehicle and equipment makers are permitted to appeal such penalties, but this is a difficult direction. Non-compliances found that are arguably without effect to highway safety may be petitioned to skip recall (remedy and notification) requirements for vehicles already produced.

Regulatory differences

Historically, one of the most conspicuous differences between UN and US regulations was the design and performance of headlamps. The Citroën DS shown here illustrates the large differences in headlamps during the 1940-1983 era when US regulations required sealed beam headlamps, which were prohibited in many European countries. A similar approach was evident with the US mandatory side marker lights.

1998 Agreement
The "Agreement concerning the Establishing of Global Technical Regulations for Wheeled Vehicles, Equipment and Parts which can be fitted and/or be used on Wheeled Vehicles", or 1998 Agreement, is a subsequent agreement. Following its mission to harmonize vehicle regulations, the UNECE solved the main issues (Administrative Provisions for Type approval opposed to self-certification and mutual recognition of Type Approvals) preventing non-signatory Countries to the 1958 Agreement to fully participate to its activities.

The 1998 Agreement is born to produce meta regulations called Global Technical Regulations without administrative procedures for type approval and so, without the principle of mutual recognition of Type Approvals. The 1998 Agreement stipulates that Contracting Parties will establish, by consensus vote, United Nations Global Technical Regulations (UN GTRs) in a UN Global Registry. The UN GTRs contain globally harmonized performance requirements and test procedures. Each UN GTR contains extensive notes on its development. The text includes a record of the technical rationale, the research sources used, cost and benefit considerations, and references to data consulted. The Contracting Parties use their nationally established rulemaking processes when transposing UN GTRs into their national legislation. The 1998 Agreement currently has 33 Contracting Parties and 14 UN GTRs that have been established into the UN Global Registry. Manufacturers and suppliers cannot use directly the UN GTRs as these are intended to serve the Countries and require transposition in national or regional law.

2013 Transatlantic Trade and Investment Partnership (proposed)
As part of the Transatlantic Trade and Investment Partnership (TTIP) negotiations, the issues of divergent standards in automobile regulatory structure are being investigated. TTIP negotiators are seeking to identify ways to narrow the regulatory differences, potentially reducing costs and spurring additional trade in vehicles.

OICA
Organisation Internationale des Constructeurs d'Automobiles (OICA) hosts on its web site the working documents from various United Nations expert groups including World Forum for Harmonization of Vehicle Regulations.

See also
Vehicle regulation
Car safety
Worldwide harmonized Light vehicles Test Procedures
National Highway Traffic Safety Administration
Federal Motor Vehicle Safety Standards
Federal Motor Vehicle Safety Standard 108
Automotive lighting
Headlamps

References

External links
UN Regulations
World Forum for Harmonization of Vehicle Regulations (WP.29) – How It Works, How to Join It
World Forum for Harmonization of Vehicle Regulations FAQ

Automotive standards
Automotive safety
United Nations Economic Commission for Europe